Kailua High School is a four-year public high school located in the Kailua CDP, City and County of Honolulu, Hawaii, United States on the island of O‘ahu. The school serves students grades 9 through 12.

As of the 2000 U.S. Census the U.S. Census Bureau defined the school as being in the Maunawili CDP, but as of the 2010 U.S. Census it was redefined as being in Kailua CDP.

History
In 1955 Kailua opened on the current site of Kailua Intermediate School in the middle of Kailua Town.

Kailua High is one of four public high schools on the windward side of Oahu and serves the neighborhoods of Kailua, Waimanalo and Maunawili, approximately 50,000 residents.

Athletics
Kailua High School also has an array of sports for its students. They compete in the Oahu Interscholastic Association. These sports include:

Air Riflery
Cheerleading
Cross-Country
Football (Varsity)
Football (JV)
Softball (JV)
Girls Volleyball
Boys Basketball
Girls Basketball
Baseball (JV)
Swimming
Tennis (JV)
Wrestling
Boys Soccer
Girls Soccer
Paddling
Baseball (Varsity)
Golf
Judo
Tennis (Varsity)
Track
Boys Volleyball
Water Polo (G)
Softball

Notable alumni
 Doug Capilla, professional baseball player
 Russ Francis, NFL player San Francisco 49ers
 Derek Ho, professional Surfer, Pipeline Masters winner
 Michael Ho, professional Surfer, Triple Crown winner
 Agnes Lum, model
 Denise Michele, model
 Albert Pyun, film director
 Samson Satele, professional football player
 Joe Wong, American football player

References

External links
 Kailua High School official website
 Kailua High School Alumni Association
 Class Reunion Websites

Public high schools in Honolulu County, Hawaii
Educational institutions established in 1955
1955 establishments in Hawaii